Eugene "Boo" Corrigan is the Director of Athletics for the NC State Wolfpack. Previously, Corrigan served as an associate athletic director for Duke University, the University of Notre Dame, and the United States Military Academy. Corrigan is the son of Gene Corrigan, former commissioner of the Atlantic Coast Conference. Corrigan graduated from the University of Notre Dame with a bachelor's degree in 1990, and Virginia Commonwealth University with a master's degree in 2013. Corrigan was named the Athletic Director at the United States Military Academy on February 1, 2011.

North Carolina State University announced that Corrigan will begin his tenure as the athletic director effective May 1, 2019.

References

External links
 
 Army profile
 Duke profile

Year of birth missing (living people)
Living people
Army Black Knights athletic directors
Duke University staff
NC State Wolfpack athletic directors
University of Notre Dame alumni
Virginia Commonwealth University alumni